Conan Lee Gray (born December 5, 1998) is an American singer and songwriter. Born in Lemon Grove, California and raised in Georgetown, Texas, he began uploading vlogs, covers and original songs to YouTube as a teenager. Gray signed a record deal with Republic Records in 2018, where he released his debut EP Sunset Season (2018). Bolstered by the commercially successful singles "Maniac" and "Heather", his debut studio album Kid Krow (2020) debuted at number five on the US Billboard 200, making it the biggest US new artist debut of the year. His second studio album, Superache (2022), received critical acclaim and debuted within the top 10 in the United States, the United Kingdom, Australia, Ireland and the Netherlands.

Early life
Conan Lee Gray was born on December 5, 1998, in Lemon Grove, California, to a father of mostly Irish ancestry and a Japanese mother. As an infant, his family moved to Hiroshima, Japan, due to his grandfather requiring medical care. After living there for two years, the family moved back to California. Gray previously spoke Japanese fluently, but has since lost his proficiency.

Gray's parents divorced when he was three years old. In a "Draw My Life" video, he details his experiences with divorce as a young child. As his father was in the military, Gray moved twelve times throughout his childhood, moving three times during sixth grade alone. Gray was frequently bullied throughout grade school. At one point, he was one of only five Asian children at his school.

Gray eventually settled in Georgetown, Texas, as a preteen where he remained for the rest of his teenage years. Gray's life in central Texas inspired much of his art and music. He was accepted to UCLA, and moved to Los Angeles, California in September 2017.

Career

2015–2017: career beginnings on YouTube 
He created his official channel in 2013, and began creating videos at age fifteen. His early videos included topics such as baking and mainly focused around his  everyday day life. Gray's vlog content centers heavily on his life in small-town Texas. He is often hailed for his appreciation of Americana-related nostalgia. Gray has recorded music, showed his art, and created other videos for his vlog with more than 25 million views.

2018–2019: Sunset Season 
Conan Gray self-released his debut single "Idle Town", in March 2017. The song gained over 14 million streams on Spotify and 12 million views on YouTube. Gray self-released his second single "Grow" on September 1, 2017, with the music video following the next day. In October 2018, Gray released the single "Generation Why" on Republic Records, which was described as "a rallying call to millennials." In November 2018, Gray released the five-track EP Sunset Season which includes the songs "Idle Town", "Generation Why", "Crush Culture", "Greek God", and "Lookalike". The EP peaked at No. 2 on the Billboard Heatseekers Albums chart and at No. 116 on the Billboard 200. Gray embarked on a North American tour in support of the EP with Girl in Red.

Gray made his  late-night television debut when he performed on Late Night with Seth Meyers on the eve of February 2019 before performing several shows as an opening act for Panic! at the Disco during their Pray for the Wicked Tour. He played concert festivals such as The Great Escape in addition to touring nationally.

In February 2019, Gray re-released the single "The Other Side", after originally publishing it on YouTube in 2016 on the eve of the first day of his senior year at high school. Between March and October 2019, Gray released a series of singles off of his debut album, Kid Krow, namely "Checkmate", "Comfort Crowd", and "Maniac", and an independent single, "The King". In October 2019, Gray embarked on his second headlining tour of North America with support from acclaimed New Zealand musician Benee as well as American recording artist UMI. As of October 2019, Gray's catalog had gained over 250 million streams across all platforms collectively. Gray was awarded the 2019 Shorty Award for Best YouTube Musician, and was nominated for Breakthrough Artist at the 2019 Streamy Awards.

2020–2021: Kid Krow 
Throughout the second week of 2020, Gray shared daily hints about the title of his debut album on Twitter. On January 9, 2020, he revealed the title, Kid Krow, and wrote, "I say more on this album than I've ever said in my life, and I can't wait to tell you all of my secrets. Love y'all." Gray released "The Story" on the same day of the album's announcement, as well as "Wish You Were Sober" as a surprise release two days before the album's release. During early 2020, Gray's single "Maniac" became successful on international mainstream pop radio, specifically in Australia, where it was certified platinum. The song was also certified Platinum in Canada and Gold in the US, making it his first certified song in all three countries. It became his first Billboard-charting single when it reached number 25 on the Bubbling Under Hot 100 chart, as well as the top 100 charts of Australia, Ireland and South Korea.

Gray released his debut full-length studio album Kid Krow on March 20, 2020, which debuted at number 5 on the Billboard 200 as well as number 1 on the US Pop Albums chart and number 2 on the Top Album Sales chart with over 37 thousand pure sales. In the US, it was the biggest new artist debut of 2020 as of March and was the top pop solo debut album in over two years since Camila Cabello's 2018 self-titled album. The album was praised by publications such as Paper, Billboard, NPR, Teen Vogue and Paste.

Gray was scheduled to perform on The Tonight Show Starring Jimmy Fallon on March 16, as well as Coachella in mid April 2020, however both performances were cancelled due to the COVID-19 pandemic. In mid 2020, both Forbes and Billboard listed Gray as a frontrunner in their predictions for Best New Artist nominees at the 2021 Grammy Awards. Following the commercial success of Kid Krow, Apple Music named Gray as an Up Next artist and released an exclusive mini-documentary about him in April 2020. His Kid Krow World Tour with support from Bülow has been postponed until further notice.

In August 2020, the song "Heather" became popular on the social media platform TikTok, consequently becoming Kid Krow's sixth and final single. It made Gray his first entry on the Billboard Hot 100 in his career, and further charted in the top 40 of countries such as the United Kingdom, Australia, New Zealand, and Ireland. It became his most commercially successful single since "Maniac", which achieved international mainstream hit radio success earlier that year. Gray performed "Heather" on both The Late Late Show with James Corden and The Today Show in October 2020 . He released the single "Fake" with American singer Lauv in October 2020.

2022–present: Superache 
Between May 2021 and January 2022, Gray released the singles "Astronomy", "People Watching" and "Jigsaw". On April 11, 2022, Gray announced that his second album Superache would be released on June 24, 2022. On April 15, 2022, he released the song "Memories", and on May 19 he released the fifth single of the album, "Yours", and revealed the track list. The album is 12 tracks and a total of 40 minutes long. It was released on June 24, 2022. Alongside with the album, the video for the single "Disaster" was also released. On July 18, 2022, he sang the national anthem at the 2022 Major League Baseball Home Run Derby.

Artistry 
Gray has been described as a pop, indie pop, acoustic pop, and bedroom pop artist. Teen Vogue called Gray "the pop prince for sad internet teens".

Influences 

Gray has cited Taylor Swift as his biggest inspiration, stating that he "was raised by [her]" and that he is "the largest Swiftie". He told People, "I love her so much. I love her music. I love what she does. I love her lyricism. I love how she's handled her career. She's just such a fucking boss. I grew up listening to her music since I was nine years old. I feel like she shaped me so much as a person." Swift praised Gray's debut album Kid Krow and the track "Wish You Were Sober" on her personal Instagram story, to which Gray responded, "Thank you for being my lifelong songwriting inspiration and icon. I honestly feel like you raised me both as a writer and a human and I cannot express in words how much the means to me. Thank you for everything. Swiftie for life". In an interview with Zane Lowe, for Apple Music, Gray stated that Swift is his "number one above all", and continued that "she's just my songwriting icon, and I'll never understand how she does what she does. She's just amazing". Gray also revealed that Swift messaged him and complimented Kid Krow.

Gray acknowledged Lorde as one of his other primary influences, and has explained that his EP Sunset Season was majorly inspired by the small-town nostalgia of her debut album Pure Heroine. He has also cited The Chicks and Adele as some of his musical influences, as well as expressing a mutual admiration for V of BTS, and Billie Eilish. Talking about Eilish's rapid rise to fame in 2019, Gray told ET: "Billie and I have been friends since, like, literally forever, since she was, like, 15. I was like, 17. We were really young. Watching her have to figure out all these little things along the way has been really helpful for me." Gray has also identified Lana Del Rey as one of his stronger pop influences; he has covered a few of her songs.

Discography

Studio albums

Extended plays

Singles

Other charted songs

Notes

Awards and nominations

Tours

Headlining tours
 Sunset Shows (2018–19)
 Comfort Crowd Tour (2019)
 Conan Gray World Tour 2022
 Superache Tour (2022-23)

Supporting tours
 Pray for the Wicked Tour (2019) (Panic! at the Disco)

Cancelled tours 

 Kid Krow World Tour (2020)

References

External links
 
 
 Conan Gray's Fans Had Front Row Seat To His Path To Rising Star – Documentary by Uproxx and Honda

1998 births
Living people
21st-century American singers
Music YouTubers
American YouTubers
People from Georgetown, Texas
People from Lemon Grove, California
American musicians of Japanese descent
American people of Irish descent
American male singer-songwriters
21st-century American male singers
Republic Records artists
Singer-songwriters from Texas
Singer-songwriters from California